Animatronics refers to mechatronic puppets. They are a modern variant of the automaton and are often used for the portrayal of characters in films and in theme park attractions.

It is a multidisciplinary field integrating puppetry, anatomy and mechatronics. Animatronic figures can be implemented with both computer and human control, including teleoperation. Motion actuators are often used to imitate muscle movements and create realistic motions. Figures are usually encased in body shells and flexible skins made of hard and soft plastic materials and finished with colors, hair, feathers and other components to make them more lifelike. Animatronics stem from a long tradition of mechanical automata powered by hydraulics, pneumatics and clockwork. Greek mythology and ancient Chinese writings mention early examples of automata. The oldest extant automaton is dated to the 16th century.

Before the term "animatronics" became common, they were usually referred to as "robots". Since then, robots have become known as more practical programmable machines that do not necessarily resemble living creatures. Robots (or other artificial beings) designed to convincingly resemble humans are known as "androids". The term Animatronics is a portmanteau of animate and electronics. The term Audio-Animatronics was coined by Walt Disney in 1961 when he started developing animatronics for entertainment and film. Audio-Animatronics does not differentiate between animatronics and androids.

Autonomatronics was also defined by Disney Imagineers to describe more advanced Audio-Animatronic technology featuring cameras and complex sensors to process and respond to information in the character's environment.

History

Timeline 

 
 
 
 

 
 
 
 
 
2005: Engineered Arts produces the first version of their animatronic actor, RoboThespian

Modern attractions 

The first animatronics characters shown to the public were a dog and a horse, as separate attractions at the 1939 New York World's Fair. Sparko, The Robot Dog (the "pet" of Elektro the Robot) is considered the first modern-day animatronic character, as it represented a living animal rather than a purely mechanical figure. An unnamed animatronic horse, which was reported to gallop realistically, was also exhibited.

Laffing Sal was one of several automated characters used to attract carnival and amusement park patrons to funhouses and dark rides throughout the United States.  Its movements were accompanied by a raucous recorded laugh that sometimes frightened small children and annoyed adults.

Walt Disney is often credited for popularizing animatronics for entertainment after he bought an animatronic bird while vacationing (in either New Orleans or Europe). Disney's vision for Audio-Animatronics was primarily focused on patriotic displays rather than amusements.

In 1951, two years after Disney developed animatronics, he commissioned machinist Roger Broggie and sculptor Wathel Rogers to lead a team tasked with creating a 9" figure that could talk and recreate dance routines performed by actor Buddy Ebsen. The figure, dubbed Project Little Man, was never finished. A year later, Walt Disney Imagineering was created. Disney used what appeared as an animatronic bird in his film Mary Poppins (1964), which was actually controlled by bicycle cables.

After Project Little Man, the Imagineering team's first project was a "Chinese head" which was on display in the lobby of their office. Customers could ask the head questions and it replied with words of wisdom. The eyes blinked and its mouth opened and closed.

Walt Disney Productions started using animatronics in 1955 for Disneyland's Jungle Cruise ride, then for its Walt Disney's Enchanted Tiki Room attraction, which featured animatronic tropical birds and other characters.

The first fully audio-animatronic human figure was that of Abraham Lincoln, created by Disney for the 1964 World's Fair in New York. In 1965, Disney upgraded the figure, dubbed the Lincoln Mark II, to appear at the Opera House at Disneyland Resort in California. For three months, while the original Lincoln performed in New York, the Lincoln Mark II gave five performances per hour at Disneyland. Actor Royal Dano voiced both versions of the figure.

Lucky the Dinosaur is the first free-roving Audio-Animatronic figure created by Disney's Imagineers. An approximately  green Segnosaurus figure, it pulls a flower-covered cart and is led by Chandler the Dinosaur Handler. The flower cart Lucky pulls conceals its computer and power source.

The Muppet Mobile Lab is a free-roving Audio-Animatronic unit designed by Walt Disney Imagineering. Two Muppet characters, Dr. Bunsen Honeydew and his assistant Beaker, pilot their "laboratory" vehicle through the park, interacting with guests and deploying special effects such as foggers, flashing lights, moving signs, confetti cannons and spray jets. The attraction is currently deployed at Hong Kong Disneyland in Hong Kong.

Film and television 
The film industry has been a driving force revolutionizing the technology used to develop animatronics. Animatronics are used in situations where a creature does not exist, the action is too risky or costly to use real actors or animals, or the action could never be obtained with a living person or animal. Its main advantage over CGI and stop motion is that the simulated creature has a physical presence moving in front of the camera in real time. The technology behind animatronics has become more advanced and sophisticated over the years, making the puppets even more lifelike.

Animatronics were first introduced by Disney in the 1964 film Mary Poppins which featured an animatronic bird.  Since then, animatronics have been used extensively in such movies as Jaws, and E.T. the Extra-Terrestrial, which relied heavily on animatronics.

Directors such as Steven Spielberg and Jim Henson have been pioneers in using animatronics in the film industry; a film co-directed by the latter, The Dark Crystal, showcased groundbreaking puppets designed by Brian Froud and created by Henson's then recently established Creature Shop in London.

The 1993 film Jurassic Park used a combination of computer-generated imagery in conjunction with life-sized animatronic dinosaurs built by Stan Winston and his team. Winston's animatronic "T. rex" stood almost ,
 in length and even the largest animatronics weighing  were able to perfectly recreate the
appearance and natural movement on screen of a full-sized Tyrannosaurus rex.

Jack Horner called it "the closest I've ever been to a live dinosaur". Critics referred to Spielberg's dinosaurs as breathtakingly — and terrifyingly — realistic.

The 1999 BBC miniseries Walking with Dinosaurs was produced using a combination of about 80% CGI and 20% animatronic models. The quality of computer imagery of the day was good, but animatronics were still better at distance shots, as well as closeups of the dinosaurs. Animatronics for the series were designed by British animatronics firm Crawley Creatures. The show was followed up in 2007 with a live adaptation of the series, Walking with Dinosaurs: The Arena Spectacular.

Geoff Peterson is an animatronic human skeleton that serves as the sidekick on the late-night talk show The Late Late Show with Craig Ferguson. Often referred to as a "robot skeleton", Peterson is a radio-controlled animatronic robot puppet designed and built by Grant Imahara of MythBusters.

Advertising 
The British advertisement campaign for Cadbury Schweppes titled Gorilla featured an actor inside a gorilla suit with an animatronically animated face.

The Slowskys was an advertising campaign for Comcast Cable's Xfinity broadband Internet service. The ad features two animatronic turtles, and it won the gold Effie Award in 2007.

Toys 
Some examples of animatronic toys include Teddy Ruxpin, Big Mouth Billy Bass, FurReal, Kota the triceratops, Pleo, WowWee Alive Chimpanzee, Microsoft Actimates, and Furby. Well-known brands include Cuddle Barn, PBC International, Telco, Sound N Light, Nika International, Gemmy Industries, Tickle Me Elmo, Chantilly Lane and Dan Dee.

Design 

An animatronics character is built around an internal supporting frame, usually made of steel.  Attached to these "bones" are the "muscles" which can be manufactured using elastic netting composed of styrene beads. The frame provides the support for the electronics and mechanical components, as well as providing the shape for the outer skin.

The "skin" of the figure is most often made of foam rubber, silicone or urethane poured into moulds and allowed to cure. To provide further strength a piece of fabric is cut to size and embedded in the foam rubber after it is poured into the mould.  Once the mould has fully cured, each piece is separated and attached to the exterior of the figure providing the appearance and texture similar to that of "skin".

Structure 
An animatronics character is typically designed to be as realistic as possible and thus, is built similarly to how it would be in real life. The framework of the figure is like the "skeleton". Joints, motors, and actuators act as the "muscles". Connecting all the electrical components together are wires, such as the "nervous system" of a real animal or person. Steel, aluminum, plastic, and wood are all commonly used in building animatronics but each has its best purpose. The relative strength, as well as the weight of the material itself, should be considered when determining the most appropriate material to use. The cost of the material may also be a concern. Several materials are commonly used in the fabrication of an animatronics figure's exterior. Dependent on the particular circumstances, the best material will be used to produce the most lifelike form. For example, "eyes" and "teeth" are commonly made completely out of acrylic.

Materials 

 Latex: White latex is commonly used as a general material because it has a high level of elasticity. It is also pre-vulcanized, making it easy and fast to apply. Latex is produced in several grades. Grade 74 is a popular form of latex that dries rapidly and can be applied very thick, making it ideal for developing molds. Foam latex is a lightweight, soft form of latex which is used in masks and facial prosthetics to change a person's outward appearance, and in animatronics to create a realistic "skin". The Wizard of Oz was one of the first films to make extensive use of foam latex prosthetics in the 1930s.
 Silicone: Disney has a research team devoted to improving and developing better methods of creating more lifelike animatronics exteriors with silicone. RTV silicone (room temperature vulcanization silicone) is used primarily as a molding material as it is very easy to use but is relatively expensive. Few other materials stick to it, making molds easy to separate. Bubbles are removed from silicone by pouring the liquid material in a thin stream or processing in a vacuum chamber prior to use. Fumed silica is used as a bulking agent for thicker coatings of the material.
 Polyurethane: Polyurethane rubber is a more cost effective material to use in place of silicone. Polyurethane comes in various levels of hardness which are measured on the Shore scale. Rigid polyurethane foam is used in prototyping because it can be milled and shaped in high density. Flexible polyurethane foam is often used in the actual building of the final animatronic figure because it is flexible and bonds well with latex.
 Plaster: As a commonplace construction and home decorating material, plaster is widely available. Its rigidity limits its use in moulds, and plaster moulds are unsuitable when undercuts are present. This may make plaster far more difficult to use than softer materials like latex or silicone.

Movement 
Pneumatic actuators can be used for small animatronics but are not powerful enough for large designs and must be supplemented with hydraulics.  To create more realistic movement in large figures, an analog system is generally used to give the figures a full range of fluid motion rather than simple two position movements.

Mimicking the often subtle displays of humans and other living creatures, and the associated movement is a challenging task when developing animatronics. One of the most common emotional models is the Facial Action Coding System (FACS) developed by Ekman and Friesen. FACS defines that through facial expression, humans can recognize 6 basic emotions: anger, disgust, fear, joy, sadness, and surprise.  Another theory is that of Ortony, Clore, and Collins, or the OCC model which defines 22 different emotional categories.

In 2020 Disney revealed its new animatronics robot that can breathe, move its eyes very much like humans, and identify people around it in order to select "an appropriate" response, as opposed to previous Disney animatronics that were used in purely scripted, non-interactive situations, like theme park rides.

Training and education 
Animatronics has been developed as a career which combines the disciplines of mechanical engineering, casting/sculpting, control technologies, electrical/electronic systems, radio control and airbrushing.

Some colleges and universities do offer degree programs in animatronics.  Individuals interested in animatronics typically earn a degree in robotics which closely relate to the specializations needed in animatronics engineering.

Students achieving a bachelor's degree in robotics commonly complete courses in:

 Mechanical engineering
 Industrial robotics
 Mechatronics systems
 Modeling of robotics systems
 Robotics engineering
 Foundational theory of robotics
 Introduction to robotics.

Animatronics and artificial intelligence 

The Disney company is about to use animatronics and artificial intelligence to simulate one of their characters in real life: Pascal, one of the characters in the movie Tangled.

On the other hand, Dubai is already using police robots created by PAL Robotics.

In popular culture 
Animatronic characters appear in both films and video games, most notably in horror genre and survival horror video games that generally features possessed animatronics as antagonists.

Films 

 The Banana Splits Movie, a 2019 American comedy horror film starring Dani Kind, Steve Lund, Sara Canning, and the voice of Eric Bauza, follows a young boy and his family who, as a birthday present, attend a live taping of a successful children's television series featuring Fleegle, Bingo, Drooper, and Snorky, four goofy-like animatronic characters. However, their new software updates go haywire upon learning the upcoming cancellation of their show and the characters start a killing spree that the crew and audience must survive. It is a horror reimagining of the 1968-1970 Hanna-Barbera's television series of the same name.
 Ek Hasina Thi, a 2004 neo - noir thriller Indian movie directed by Sriram Raghavan, starring Saif Ali Khan and Urmila Matondkar in the lead roles, revolves around Sarika (Urmila Matondkar), who is betrayed by the man whom she loves, Karan (Saif Ali Khan). The climax of the movie features Sarika killing Karan with animatronic rats, thus fulfilling her quest for revenge.
 Willy's Wonderland, a 2021 American action comedy horror film starring Nicolas Cage, Emily Tosta, David Sheftell and Beth Grant, follows a quiet drifter who is tricked into cleaning up a once-successful abandoned family entertainment center while battling the restaurant's eight murderous animatronic characters (possessed by souls of cannibalistic serial killers) with the aid of a teenager and her friends.

Short films 
The Hug, a 2018 horror short film directed by Jack Bishop and Justin Nijm, and starring Nick Armstrong and Roman George, follows a bratty birthday boy at Pandory's Pan Pizza Palace, a ShowBiz Pizza Place-like restaurant, who has an awkward situation with Pandory the Panda, the pizzeria's giant panda animatronic mascot. It premiered at Hulu as part of its "Huluween" film competition.

Television 
 The Capicola Gang, a trio of evil anthropomorphic animatronic animals from The Fun Fun Zone, consisting of Dominic (a robot bear, although listed in the credits as Main Bear), who is based on Vito Corleone from The Godfather, Louie (a robot beaver), Amelia (a robot duck, although listed in the credits as Duck Lady), are the main  antagonists in the Regular Show episodes "Fuzzy Dice" and "Steak Me Amadeus". The Capicola Gang Leader had a cameo appearance as an incriminating witness in "Can you Ear Me Now?" where he testified in court against Mordecai and Rigby. They share a resemblance to the characters from the popular game series Five Nights at Freddy's and the popular kids entertainment center Chuck E. Cheese.
 Hoo-Ha's Jamboree, an animatronic band at Hoo-Ha Owl's Pizzamatronic Jamboree, and a parody of The Rock-afire Explosion of ShowBiz Pizza Place, which consist of Hoo-Ha the Owl (guitarist, and lead singer), Cheerleader (banjoist), Beaver (guitarist), Rat in a Barrel (two same animatronics sit on either side of the stage), Cowboy Frog (bongo player), and Will E. Badger (opening act)  are the secondary antagonists in the Gravity Falls episodes "Soos and the Real Girl", "Weirdmageddon Part 1", and "Weirdmageddon 2: Escape From Reality". They are seen in photos in "Not What He Seems".

Video games 
 Five Nights at Freddy's, a horror video game series, features various animatronic entertainers as antagonists who try to kill the player character, who is typically a nighttime security guard or employee at one of the facilities (usually a pizzeria) where the animatronics reside. In the first game of the series, the animatronics' violent attitude towards humans at night is explained away as faulty programming, which causes them to mistake the protagonist for an endoskeleton without a character suit on—which goes against the establishment's rules. As a result, the animatronics try to "forcefully stuff" the player character into a suit, resulting in their death. However, the games feature a deep lore (gradually revealed through various minigames and Easter eggs) which reveals that many of the animatronics are actually haunted by the spirits of children whose deaths are somehow connected to the fictional restaurant franchise "Freddy Fazbear's Pizza". At least six of these children were murdered by William Afton (a.k.a. "The Purple Guy"), one of the co-founders of the original restaurant and the series' overarching villain, who would go on to possess an animatronic of his own after his death. Since the original game, Five Nights at Freddy's has evolved into a large media franchise comprising various sequels, prequels and spin-offs, a novel trilogy, and an anthology series of short stories. A film adaptation is also in development.

See also

 Automaton

 Karakuri ningyō
 Robotic performance art
 Uncanny valley

References 
Footnotes

Sources

External links 

 
Robotics hardware
Articles containing video clips